Old Well is a 1987 Chinese film written by Zheng Yi about a village worker's effort of digging a well in his water-starved hometown located in northwest China and his affairs with his old girlfriend. It is produced by Xi'an Film Studio and directed by Wu Tianming, starring Zhang Yimou and Liang Yujin.

The film won the 8th Golden Rooster awards for Best Picture, Director, Leading Male Actor, and Supporting Female Actor in 1988. The film also won the Best Feature Film and Leading Male Actor awards at the 1987 Tokyo International Film Festival.

The film is based on the novel of the same name, also written by Zheng Yi, first published in China. It was translated by David Kwan to English and published in 1990 by China Books & Periodicals in the United States.

Notes

External links

Old Well from the Chinese Movie Database

1986 films
1980s Mandarin-language films
1986 drama films
Golden Rooster Best Film recipients
Films directed by Wu Tianming
Chinese drama films